HMAS Samuel Benbow was an auxiliary minesweeper operated by the Royal Australian Navy (RAN) during World War II. She was launched in 1918 by Hall, Russell & Company, Aberdeen. She was a Strath class trawler admiralty design. The ship operated in Australian waters from 1929, and was requisitioned by the RAN and commissioned on 5 September 1940. She was returned to her owners after the war.

Operational history

Samuel Benbow was purchased by A. A. Murrell and sailed to Australia in 1928.

With the outbreak of World War II, she was requisitioned by the RAN. On 5 September 1940, Samuel Benbow was commissioned by the RAN for use as an auxiliary minesweeper. Samuel Benbow was in Sydney Harbour during the attack on Sydney Harbour on 31 May-1 June 1942.

She was returned to her owners in late 1946 and resuming trawling. She was adrift for nine hours after her propeller was fowled by her nets on 14 January 1951, before being towed into Sydney by Goonambee. Her captain drowned after being caught in her nets in November 1952.

Citations

1918 ships
Ships built in Aberdeen
Minesweepers of the Royal Australian Navy
Fishing ships of Australia